You Can Play These Songs with Chords is an early (1996-97) demo from the rock band Death Cab for Cutie, which at the time consisted entirely of founder Ben Gibbard. This demo was originally released on cassette by Elsinor Records. It proved so popular, Gibbard recruited other musicians to make a full band, which would go on to record Something About Airplanes, the band's debut studio album.

You Can Play These Songs with Chords was expanded with ten more songs and re-released on October 22, 2002, through Barsuk Records on the heels of the success of The Photo Album.

Track listing

Original release
All songs written by Benjamin Gibbard.

Re-issue additional tracks
All songs written by Benjamin Gibbard, Nick Harmer and Christopher Walla except as otherwise noted.

Personnel
Ben Gibbard – vocals, guitar, bass guitar, piano, drums
Nathan Good – drums, tambourine
Nick Harmer – bass guitar
Christopher Walla – guitar, vocals "New Candles" and "Tomorrow"

References

External links
 

1997 debut albums
Death Cab for Cutie albums
Barsuk Records albums
Demo albums